Palla ussheri, or Ussher's palla, is a butterfly in the family Nymphalidae. It is found in Guinea, Sierra Leone, Liberia, Ivory Coast, Ghana, Nigeria, Cameroon, Gabon, the Republic of the Congo, the Central African Republic, the Democratic Republic of the Congo, Uganda, Tanzania and Zambia. The habitat consists of lowland evergreen forests.

The larvae feed on Dichapetalum species, Prevostea breviflora, Bonomia poranoides and Toddalia asiatica.

Subspecies
Palla ussheri ussheri (Guinea, Sierra Leone, Liberia, Ivory Coast, Ghana, Nigeria)
Palla ussheri dobelli (Hall, 1919) (Cameroon, Gabon, Congo, Central African Republic, western and central Democratic Republic of the Congo)
Palla ussheri interposita Joicey & Talbot, 1925 (central and western Uganda, western Tanzania, Zambia)

References

Butterflies described in 1870
Charaxinae
Butterflies of Africa
Taxa named by Arthur Gardiner Butler